Following is a list of senators of Seine-Saint-Denis, people who have represented the department of Seine-Saint-Denis in the Senate of France.
The department was created from the former Seine and Seine-et-Oise departments in 1968.

Senators for Seine-Saint-Denis under the French Fifth Republic:

References

Sources

 
Lists of members of the Senate (France) by department